Parc de la Cité, is a large park in Longueuil, Quebec, Canada. It is located at 6205 Davis Boulevard in the borough of Saint-Hubert.

Geography 
This park is located between boulevard Gaétan Boucher and rue des Orchidées; between boulevard Julien Bouthillier and boulevard Cousineau. Each of these streets has an entrance to the park; another entrance is located at the end of Davis Boulevard.

This park has an artificial lake 1.1 km (1200 yards) long.

Main attractions 
The Route Verte's La Montée du chemin de Chambly trail runs adjacent to the park.

The park features a  artificial lake, which serves as a retention basin, which is surrounded by wooded areas. A large hill overlooks the lake, and offers views of the surrounding area.

Footbridge and bridge extending Davis Boulevard and spanning Lake City

The park was created in 1992 in order to build the retention basin, and soon became heavily frequented by nearby residents.

It hosts many events each year, such as the local celebrations for the Fête nationale du Québec, as well as Lac en fête, and the grand concert presented by the Orchestre symphonique de Longueuil.

Visitor center 
A 550 square metres (5,920 sq ft) visitor center providing first aid services, sanitary facilities as well as a Cafe, a free parking lot and rest areas is also available. Additionally, it offers summer and winter sporting equipment rental.

Opening hours 

The park is open year round from 7:00 a.m. to 11:00 p.m. The reception pavilion on Boulevard Davis is open as follows:

References

Longueuil
Parks in Quebec
1992 establishments in Quebec